The exorcism of the Gerasene demoniac (Matthew 8.28-34; Mark 5.1-20; Luke 8.26-39), frequently known as the Miracle of the (Gadarene) Swine and the exorcism of Legion, is one of the miracles performed by Jesus according to the New Testament. The story shows Jesus exorcising a demon or demons out of a man and into a herd of swine, causing the swine to run down a hill into a lake and drown themselves.

The story appears in the three Synoptic Gospels, but not the Gospel of John. All accounts involve Jesus exorcising demons, identified collectively in Mark and Luke as "Legion".

The story was interpreted by Saints Augustine of Hippo and Thomas Aquinas to mean that Christians have no duties to animals. It has been a point of contention in discussions of Christianity and animal rights.

Narratives

Mark
The earliest account, assuming the theory of Marcan priority is correct, is in the Gospel of Mark. Jesus goes across the sea into the "region of the Gerasenes". There, a man "possessed by a demon" comes from the caves to meet him. People had tried to tie him down but he was too strong to be bound, even with chains, for he would always break out of them; night and day among the tombs and in the hills he would cry out and cut himself with stones. Jesus approaches and calls the demon to come out of the man, who replies "What do you want with me, Jesus, Son of the Most High God? I beg you in the name of God never to torment me!". Jesus asks the demon for his name and is told "My name is Legion, for we are many". The demons beg Jesus not to send them away, but instead to send them into the pigs on a nearby hillside, which he does. The herd, about two thousand in number, rush down the steep bank into the sea and are drowned. The man is now seen, dressed and restored to sanity: he asks to be included among the disciples who travel with Jesus, but he is refused and instructed to remain in the Decapolis region, to tell of "the great things the Lord has done ... and [how he] has had compassion on you". Theologian Tom Wright calls him "the first apostle to the gentiles".

Matthew

The Gospel of Matthew shortens the story dramatically and writes not of one possessed man, but of two.  In this version, Jesus does not ask for the demon's name, which is considered an important element of traditional exorcism practice.

The location is also changed to the region of the "Gadarenes" (Gadara) as in most Bible translations. The King James Version in  has the location as "Gergesenes" which corresponds to the modern "Kursi" (Kheras), the most plausible location of the Gospel event.

Luke 
The Gospel of Luke's version is shorter than Mark's, but agrees with most of its details. One detail that is unique to Luke's version is a reference to both the demoniac’s nakedness and his subsequent clothing.  At Luke 8:27, the gospel writer notes that the demoniac wore no clothes. Then he notes that he “was clothed and in his own mind” (Luke 8:35). Clothing is an important prop in the Lucan narrative (see Biblical clothing), which in this scene portrays the demoniac’s development from his animal-like state to his restoration as a human being. Initially, the possessed man has been expelled from the human race—that is, he is no better off than an animal without clothing—but, after his exorcism, his humanity is fully restored and he rejoins the human race, “clothed and in his right mind” (Luke 8:35).

Commentary

Gerasa, Gadara, or Gergesa?

The story appears to be set close to the Sea of Galilee, since it takes place as soon as Jesus gets out of the boat, but neither Gadara nor Gerasa is nearby; both cities are southeast of the lake, Gadara 10 km away or a two-hour walking distance, and Gerasa well over twice as far. Origen  (Commentary on John 6:24 §41 [on John 1:28]) cited a local tradition that there had been a town called "Gergasa" on the lake shore.

The differing geographical references to Gadara and Gerasa can be understood in light of the social, economic, and political influence each city exerted over the region. In this light, Matthew identified the exorcism with the local center of power, Gadara, located about ten kilometres southeast of Sea of Galilee, whereas Mark identified the event with the regional center of power, Gerasa, located further inland. The city of Gerasa had been a major urban center since its founding and during the Roman period it was the more widely known among the ten-city league known as the Decapolis.

As to the candidate for the location of the Gospel event, the most common consensus  is that the miracle took place near the town of Gergesa, the modern Kursi, close by the eastern shore of the Sea of Galilee, and therefore in the country of Gergesenes.

Naming, and use of singular and plural
The revealing of the demon's name has parallels with other examples in Jewish exorcism lore in the Second Temple period.

Historical and biblical context
It has been widely accepted by scholars that several motifs throughout the account refer to the Roman legion. Further possible echoes include Isaiah 65:4 with parallels to both graves and swine:

"A people who ... sit among the graves, and spend the night in the tombs;
Who eat swine's flesh, and the broth of abominable things is in their vessel".

Animal rights

Classical theological commentary cited this story to argue that animals have no moral importance in Christianity. Saint Augustine of Hippo concluded from the story that Christians have no duties towards animals, writing:

Similarly, Thomas Aquinas argued that Jesus allowed the demons to destroy the pigs in order to make the point that his purpose was primarily for the good of men's souls, not their bodies or property (including their animals). This interpretation has been shared by a long line of commentators up to the present day, including I. Howard Marshall and Mark Driscoll. However, other commentators have attempted to make the story consistent with a Jesus who shows "care and concern for animals," as John Austin Baker wrote. Such alternative readings include arguments that the swine were meant to represent the Roman army or "unclean and unfaithful" people because pigs were considered "unclean" for the Jews in this image, and the loss of these animals was not dangerous.  And that Jesus did not actually "send" the devils into the pigs, He merely allowed the demons to go where they themselves chose to go.

René Girard's Scapegoat Theory 
This episode plays a key role in the literary critic René Girard's theory of the Scapegoat. In his analysis, the opposition of the entire city to the one man possessed by demons is the typical template for a scapegoat. Girard notes that, in the demoniac's self-mutilation, he seems to imitate the stoning that the local villagers would likely have attempted to use against him to cast him out of their society, while the villagers themselves show by their reaction to Jesus that they are not primarily concerned with the good of the man possessed by demons: 

On Girard's account, then, the uneasy truce that the Gaderenes and the demoniac had worked out was that the evil power in him was contained and thereby neutralized. Jesus' arrival on the scene introduced a spiritual power stronger than Legion, which upset the social balance by removing the scapegoat. This reversal of the scapegoat mechanism by Jesus is central to Girard's entire reading of Christianity, and this reversal is on display in this story as well. Contrasting the self-destruction of the herd of pigs with the typical motif of an individual evil-doer being pushed over a cliff by an undifferentiated mob (cf. Luke 4:29), Girard comments:

Proverbial use
The story is the origin of the English proverbial adjective Gadarene, meaning "involving or engaged in a headlong or potentially disastrous rush to do something".

See also
 Life of Jesus in the New Testament
 Miracles of Jesus

References

Notes

Citations

External links

Exorcisms of Jesus
Pigs in literature
Mammals in religion
Animals in the Bible